Sokhna Benga (Mbengue) (born 12 December 1967, in Dakar) is a Senegalese novelist and poet. She writes in French.

Biography
Sokhna Benga grew up in a Muslim family.  
She studied at Dakar University, Senegal, earning a master's degree in Business Law. She later went to France, where she obtained a DESS in Maritime Law and lived for almost ten years.
She joined humanitarian associations and worked with marginalized people, particularly students.

Returning to Dakar in 2001, she became literary director of the publishing house Nouvelles éditions africaines du Sénégal (NEAS).

She is a member of the Société des gens de lettres, la Maison des Ecrivains, the Senegalese writer's association (AES), and the French writers association (ADELF).

In 2004 she became a member of the French Ordre des Arts et des Lettres (Order of Arts and Letters).

Works
2004: Waly NGuilane, le protégé de Roog (parts 1 & 2)
2003: La balade du Sabador - Grand Prix of the President 2000, Special Mention of the Grand Prix of Black Africa 2001).
1990: Le Dard du secret - Grand Prix of the Mayor of Dakar 1988.

References

External links
"Interviews", Department of French Studies, University of Warwick.
"Trois questions à Sokhna BENGA, écrivain, éditrice: ‘L’écriture n’a pas de sexe’", Wal Fadjiri.
"Sokhna BENGA, écrivain, éditrice: ‘L’écriture n’a pas de sexe’", Walf fadjri, 28 September 2007.

Senegalese novelists
1967 births
Living people
Cheikh Anta Diop University alumni
Senegalese poets
Senegalese women poets
Senegalese women writers